Irie Dam  is a gravity dam located in Hyogo Prefecture in Japan. The dam is used for power production. The catchment area of the dam is 147.2 km2. The dam impounds about 7  ha of land when full and can store 544 thousand cubic meters of water. The construction of the dam was started on 1958 and completed in 1958.

See also
List of dams in Japan

References

Dams in Hyogo Prefecture